Leptostreptus exiguus, is a species of round-backed millipede in the family Harpagophoridae. It is endemic to Sri Lanka.

References

Spirostreptida
Endemic fauna of Sri Lanka
Millipedes of Asia
Animals described in 1950